Tarakant Jha  (1927–2014)  was chairperson of the Bihar Legislative Council. He was a leader of Bharatiya Jan Sangh and later of Bharatiya Janata Party. In early 2014 he joined Janata Dal United party. Jha was a senior lawyer. He died in  May 2014.

References

2014 deaths
Members of the Bihar Legislative Council
Bharatiya Jana Sangh politicians
1927 births
20th-century Indian lawyers
Chairs of the Bihar Legislative Council
Bharatiya Janata Party politicians from Bihar
Janata Dal (United) politicians